"Where Were We?" is the first episode in the second season of the television series How I Met Your Mother. It originally aired on September 18, 2006.

Plot
Ted is extremely happy in his new relationship with Robin, while Marshall wallows in depression following his breakup with Lily. Barney is unhappy with all of them, being forced to endure either Ted and Robin being cutesy together or Marshall lamenting the loss of Lily. After forty days, Marshall has yet to leave the apartment and Robin, Ted, and Barney discuss the situation. Barney takes Marshall to a strip club, telling him that he has not gotten over Lily yet because he can still picture her naked; unfortunately, all he can think about is Lily. Ted then takes Marshall to a Yankees-Indians baseball game, but when a couple becomes engaged a few rows down from them, Marshall freaks out and throws a hot dog at the couple.

Robin, who has been hiding from Ted the fact that she likes guns, takes Marshall to a firing range, which cheers him up a little. His good mood is short lived, though, when he finds one of Lily's credit card bills in the mail. Barney tells Marshall to look at her online credit card statement to see more recent charges, and Marshall discovers charges for a hotel in New York. Despite Ted's best efforts, Marshall calls the hotel and a man answers the phone in Lily's room, presumed to be her new boyfriend. Marshall decides to go to the hotel to beg Lily to take him back, but Ted finally snaps and yells at him that he is pathetic and has spent too much time wallowing in self-pity, and that going to Lily in his current state will ruin any chance he has of ever getting back together with her. Marshall agrees not to go to the hotel, and Ted and Robin leave for a romantic weekend after persuading Barney to look after Marshall. Ted calls Barney to see how Marshall is doing, but Barney, having taken Marshall to another strip club, realizes that Marshall is gone. Ted and Robin turn around and head to the hotel.

Ted finds Marshall in the hotel bar, and Marshall tells him that he had already gone up to Lily's room and punched the guy who opened the door. He then found out that the guy wasn't Lily's new boyfriend; he had stolen Lily's credit card and was later arrested for multiple counts of identity theft. Ted tries to reassure Marshall that Lily would not come back into town without calling him and she did not have a new boyfriend, but Marshall is upset that the last link that he had to Lily was a lie. Ted reminds Marshall of the first time that they met in college, before Marshall had met Lily, and encourages him not to let the breakup destroy him. Marshall promises to try to move on with his life, but relapses the next day. However, a week later (two months after his breakup with Lily), Robin and Ted wake up one Sunday morning to find Marshall tranquilly making the pancakes Lily used to make, thus taking the first big step to learning to live without her. As Marshall begins going out again, Lily appears at MacLaren's one night. She sees her friends having drinks and considers going in, but despondently leaves unnoticed after seeing how happy Marshall is without her.

Critical response

Reviewer Joel Keller described the episode as a "very strong opening to the season" and suggested the show was ready to become "a monster hit" with just a few improvements.

References

External links

How I Met Your Mother (season 2) episodes
2006 American television episodes